The eastern black-bridged leaf turtle (Cyclemys pulchristiata) is a species of Asian leaf turtles found in southern Indochina.

Description
In this species, the carapace is reddish brown, ovoid to elongated, with wide, radiating, black lines or large, black specks. The plastron is mostly yellow and may have short, fat lines, specks, or be uniformly colored. The head is speckled, with a yellow throat. The neck is striped. Hatchlings have wide head and neck stripes and  yellow plastrons. The bridge is predominantly yellow with black stripes or entirely black. It is mostly morphologically indistinguishable from the western black-bridged leaf turtle, C. atripons, requiring genetic sampling to confidently identify. Some authorities consider this species to be a junior synonym to or a subspecies of C. atripons.

Distribution 
It is found in eastern Cambodia and in southern and central Vietnam.

References 

Cyclemys
Turtles of Asia
Reptiles of Cambodia
Reptiles of Vietnam
Reptiles described in 1997
Taxa named by Edgar Lehr